Faiyum (borrowed from   from  "the Sea, Lake") is a city in Middle Egypt. It is one of Egypt's oldest cities due to its strategic location.

Name and etymology 

Originally founded by the ancient Egyptians as Shedet, its current name in English is also spelled as Fayum, Faiyum or al-Faiyūm. Faiyum was also previously officially named Madīnat al-Faiyūm (Arabic for The City of Faiyum). The name Faiyum (and its spelling variations) may also refer to the Faiyum Oasis, although it is commonly used by Egyptians today to refer to the city.

The modern name of the city comes from Coptic  /  (whence the proper name  ), meaning the Sea or the Lake, which in turn comes from late Egyptian pꜣ-ym of the same meaning, a reference to the nearby Lake Moeris; the extinct elephant ancestor Phiomia was named after it.

Ancient history 

Archaeological evidence has found occupations around the Fayum dating back to at least the Epipalaeolithic. Middle Holocene occupations of the area are most widely studied on the north shore of Lake Moeris, where Gertrude Caton Thompson and Elinor Wight Gardner did a number of excavations of Epipalaeolithic and Neolithic sites, as well as a general survey of the area. Recently the area has been further investigated by a team from the UCLA/RUG/UOA Fayum Project.

According to Roger S. Bagnall habitation began in the fifth millennium BC and a settlement was established by the Old Kingdom (c. 2686–2181 BC) called Shedet (Medinet el-Fayyum). It was the most significant centre of the cult of the crocodile god Sobek (borrowed from the Demotic pronunciation as  Soûkhos, and then into Latin as Suchus). In consequence, the Greeks called it "Crocodile City" ( Krokodeilópolis), which was borrowed into Latin as Crocodīlopolis. The city worshipped a tamed sacred crocodile called, in Koine, Petsuchos, "the Son of Soukhos", that was adorned with gold and gem pendants. The Petsoukhos lived in a special temple pond and was fed by the priests with food provided by visitors. When Petsuchos died, it was replaced by another.

Under the Ptolemaic Kingdom, the city was for a while called Ptolemais Euergétis. Ptolemy II Philadelphus (309–246 BC) renamed the city Arsinoë and the whole nome after the name of his sister-wife Arsinoe II (316–270 or 268), who was deified after her death as part of the Ptolemaic cult of Alexander the Great, the official religion of the kingdom. Ptolemy II Philadelphus also established a town at the edge of Faiyum named Philadelphia. It was laid out in a regular grid plan to resemble a typical Greek city, with private dwellings, palaces, baths and a theatre.

Under the Roman Empire, Arsinoë became part of the province of Arcadia Aegypti. To distinguish it from other cities of the same name, it was called "Arsinoë in Arcadia".

With the arrival of Christianity, Arsinoë became the seat of a bishopric, a suffragan of Oxyrhynchus, the capital of the province and the metropolitan see. Michel Le Quien gives the names of several bishops of Arsinoë, nearly all of them associated with one heresy or another.

The Catholic Church, considering Arsinoë in Arcadia to be no longer a residential bishopric, lists it as a titular see.

Fayyum was the seat of Shahralanyozan, governor of the Sasanian Egypt (619–629).

The 10th-century Bible exegete, Saadia Gaon, thought el-Fayyum to have actually been the biblical city of Pithom, mentioned in Exodus 1:11.

Around 1245, the region became the subject of the most detailed government survey to survive from the medieval Arab world, conducted by Abū ‘Amr ‘Uthman Ibn al-Nābulusī.

Faiyum mummy portraits 

Faiyum is the source of some famous death masks or mummy portraits painted during the Roman occupation of the area. The Egyptians continued their practice of burying their dead, despite the Roman preference for cremation. While under the control of the Roman Empire, Egyptian death masks were painted on wood in a pigmented wax technique called encaustic—the Faiyum mummy portraits represent this technique. While previously believed to represent Greek settlers in Egypt, modern studies conclude that the Faiyum portraits instead represent mostly native Egyptians, reflecting the complex synthesis of the predominant Egyptian culture and that of the elite Greek minority in the city.

The Zenon Papyri

The construction of the settlement of Philadelphia under Ptolemy II Philadelphus was recorded in detail by a 3rd-century BC Greek public official named Zeno (or Zenon). Zeno, a native of Kaunos in lower Asia Minor, came to Faiyum to work as private secretary to Apollonius, the finance minister to Ptolemy II Philadelphus (and later to Ptolemy III Euergetes). During his employment, Zeno wrote detailed descriptions of the construction of theatres, gymnasiums, palaces and baths in the 250s and 240s BC, as well as making copious written records of various legal and financial transactions between citizens.

During the winter of 1914–1915, a cache of over 2,000 papyrus documents was uncovered by Egyptian agricultural labourers who were digging for sebakh near Kôm el-Kharaba el-Kebir. Upon examination by Egyptology scholars, these documents were found to be records written by Zeno in Greek and Demotic. These papyri, now referred to as the Zenon Archive or the Zenon Papyri, have provided historians with a detailed record of 3rd-century BC Philadelphia society and economy. The discovery site was identified as the former location of ancient Philadelphia. Today, the precise location of the town is unknown, although archaeologists have identified two sites in north-east Faiyum as the possible location for Philadelphia.

Modern city 

Faiyum has several large bazaars, mosques, baths and a much-frequented weekly market. The canal called Bahr Yussef runs through the city, its banks lined with houses. There are two bridges over the river: one of three arches, which carries the main street and bazaar, and one of two arches, over which is built the Qaitbay mosque, that was a gift from his wife to honor the Mamluk Sultan in Fayoum. Mounds north of the city mark the site of Arsinoe, known to the ancient Greeks as Crocodilopolis, where in ancient times the sacred crocodile kept in Lake Moeris was worshipped.
The center of the city is on the canal, with four waterwheels that were adopted by the governorate of Fayoum as its symbol; their chariots and bazaars are easy to spot. The city is home of the football club Misr Lel Makkasa SC, that play in the Egyptian Premier League.

Main sights 
 Hanging Mosque, built when the Ottomans ruled Egypt by prince Marawan bin Hatem 
 Hawara, archeological site  from the city
 Lahun Pyramids,  outside the city
 Qaitbay Mosque, in the city, and was built by the wife of the Mamluk Sultan Qaitbay
 Qasr Qarun,  from the city
It is a UNESCO World Heritage Site.

Climate 
Köppen-Geiger climate classification system classifies its climate as hot desert (BWh).

Notable people 
People from Faiyum may be known as al-Fayyumi:
 Tefta Tashko-Koço (1910-1947), well known Albanian singer was born in Faiyum, where her family lived at that time.
 Saadia Gaon (882/892-942), the influential Jewish teacher of the early 10th century, was originally from Faiyum, and often called al-Fayyumi.
 Youssef Wahbi (1898-1982), a notable Egyptian actor, well known for his influence on the development of Egyptian cinema and theater.
 Mohamed Ihab (b. 1989), Egypt's most decorated weightlifter. He is a World Champion competing in the 77 kg category until 2018 and currently in the 81 kg class. He will be representing Egypt in the Olympic Summer Games in Tokyo.

Gallery

See also

 List of cities and towns in Egypt
 Book of the Faiyum
 Fayum alphabet
 Faiyum mummy portraits
 Lake Moeris
 Phiomia (an extinct relative of the elephant, named after Faiyum)
 Nash Papyrus
 Roman Egypt
 Wadi Elrayan

References

External links 

Fayum towns and their papyri, edited with translations and notes by Bernard P. Grenfell and Arthur S. Hunt at the Internet Archive
. 148 pages, public domain.
Fayoum Photo Gallery

 
Governorate capitals in Egypt
Populated places established in the 4th millennium BC
Populated places in Faiyum Governorate
Cities in Egypt
4th-millennium BC establishments